Come Pick Me Up is the seventh studio album by American indie rock band Superchunk, released in 1999. It is marked by the presence of co-producer Jim O'Rourke, a well-known figure in underground circles. Superchunk drummer Jon Wurster said that O'Rourke was selected because the band wanted someone "coming from a different head-space." O'Rourke helped the band decorate the album with string and horn touches that were not typical of their guitar-based sound. One of the horn players who appeared on the album is another well-known figure in underground circles, Shellac's Bob Weston.

The title of the album is taken from a line in "Hello Hawk," the album's first single.

Bass player Laura Ballance did the cover painting.

Track listing
"So Convinced" – 1:59
"Hello Hawk" – 4:03
"Cursed Mirror" – 3:04
"1000 Pounds" – 3:09
"Good Dreams" – 3:01
"Low Branches" – 2:08
"Pink Clouds" – 3:22
"Smarter Hearts" – 4:25
"Honey Bee" – 3:40
"June Showers" – 3:50
"Pulled Muscle" – 3:10
"Tiny Bombs" – 4:55
"You Can Always Count on Me (In the Worst Way)" – 2:40

Personnel 
Claire Ashby – Photography
Laura Ballance – Bass, Vocals, Producer, Cover Painting
Jeb Bishop – Trombone
Rob Bochnik – Assistant Engineer
Fred Lonberg-Holm – Cello
Chris Manfrin – Handclapping
Mac McCaughan – Guitar, Keyboards, Vocals, Producer
Jim O'Rourke – Guitar, Recorder, Vocals, Producer, Mixing
John O'Rourke – Producer, Engineer, Mixing
Suzanne Roberts – Violin
Ken Vandermark – Saxophone
Bob Weston – Trumpet
Jim Wilbur – Guitar, Vocals, Producer
Jon Wurster – Percussion, Drums, Vocals, Producer

References

1999 albums
Superchunk albums
Merge Records albums
Albums produced by Jim O'Rourke (musician)